Rød is a village in Gjerstad municipality in Agder county, Norway.

References

Villages in Agder
Gjerstad